Croft Spa railway station was a railway station serving the settlements of Croft-on-Tees and Hurworth-on-Tees in County Durham, England.

The station was located on the East Coast Main Line between Northallerton and Darlington. It was served by local trains on the East Coast Main Line, and also trains operating the Eryholme-Richmond branch line.

History
The first railway to Croft-on-Tees was built by the coal-carrying Stockton and Darlington Railway (S&DR) as one of its many short branches to serve collieries. The Croft branch left the main line to the South, near Darlington Bank Top station. A passenger station opened on 27 October 1829.

The section of the Great North of England Railway (GNoER) between Darlington and York opened (for goods traffic only) on 4 January 1841; and passenger trains along the line were introduced on 30 March 1841, when a station at Croft was opened by the GNoER, which allowed the S&DR passenger station to be closed on the same day. The GNoER, after a series of amalgamations, became part of the North Eastern Railway (NER) when that was formed in 1854. The NER renamed the station Croft Spa on 1 October 1896; after it gained popularity for its spa waters, the site of which was very close to the railway station. At the start of 1923, the NER amalgamated with other railways to form the London and North Eastern Railway during the Grouping. Passing on to the Eastern Region of British Railways on nationalisation in 1948. In 1958 local trains between Northallerton and Darlington ceased stopping and it was then served only by trains to and from the Richmond branch until its closure by the British Railways Board on 3 March 1969.

The station was demolished in 1970 leaving no trace of its existence except for the ramps from a railway bridge down to the remains of the platforms but trains still pass the site on the East Coast Main Line.

See also
List of closed railway lines in Great Britain
List of closed railway stations in Britain

References

External links
 Croft Spa, SubBrit disused stations project
 Croft station  on navigable 1947 O. S. map.

Disused railway stations in the Borough of Darlington
Former North Eastern Railway (UK) stations
Railway stations in Great Britain opened in 1841
Railway stations in Great Britain closed in 1969
Beeching closures in England